The Czech Republic national long track team is the national long track motorcycle racing team of the Czech Republic and is controlled by the Autoklub of the Czech Republic (ACCR). The team was started in all editions of Team Long Track World Championship, but they never won a championship medal.

Competition

Riders 
Riders who started in Team Long Track World Championship Finals:

 Marek Čejka (2009)
 Karel Kadlec (2007, 2008)
 Pavel Ondrašík (2007, 2008, 2009)
 Zdenek Schneiderwind (2007, 2008, 2009)
 Richard Wolff (2007, 2008, 2009)

See also 
 Czech Republic national speedway team

External links 
 (cs) Autoklub of the Czech Republic webside

National long track teams
Long track
Team